Hyundai Nishat is a Pakistani automobile manufacturer and joint venture between Hyundai and Nishat Mills, based in Faisalabad, Pakistan.

Hyundai Nishat is the authorized assembler and manufacturer of Hyundai vehicles in Pakistan and began production from its Faisalabad plant in 2019.

History 
Hyundai returned to Pakistan in 2017 by partnering with Nishat Mills, a subsidiary of Nishat Group. Hyundai used to assemble cars in Pakistan until 2004, when their local partner Dewan Farooque Motors went bankrupt.

Hyundai Nishat Motor signed an investment agreement with the Ministry of Industries and Production under the Automotive Development Policy 2016-21. The intent of the government is to shake up the Japanese-dominated car market and loosen the grip of Toyota, Honda and Suzuki, who assemble cars in Pakistan with local partners.

Industry Competition 
Kia Lucky Motors, MG JW Automobile and Changan Automobile are also launching new models keeping competition alive for Hyundai. In response to the competition, Hyundai Pakistan is expected to hike production by 100 percent in the first quarter of 2021.

Product Competition 
Hyundai Nishat Motor launched Elantra sedan in March 2021. Elantra will give tough competition to Toyota Corolla and Honda Civic.

Hyundai Nishat Motor launched Santa Fe mid-size SUV to give tough competition to Kia Sorento and Toyota Fortuner.

Operations in Pakistan 
In April 2022, the owner of Hyundai Nishat Motors announced that they were considering importing car parts from India to reduce the production cost of their vehicles.

In September 2022, it was reported that the company had witnessed a massive rise in sales.However, in October 2022, the prices of Hyundai cars increased in Pakistan after the imposition of new taxes, resulting in higher costs for manufacturers and consumers. 

In November 2022, Hyundai Nishat Motors jacked up car prices again by up to PKR 500,000 in Pakistan.Despite the price hike, Hyundai Nishat Motors' sales remained strong, indicating the high demand for their vehicles in the Pakistani market.

Products

Locally Manufactured
 Hyundai Elantra (sedan)
 Hyundai Sonata  (luxury sedan)
 Hyundai Tucson (compact crossover SUV)
 Hyundai Porter H-100 (light commercial vehicle/light truck)

Imports 
 Hyundai Staria (minivan)

Discontinued 
 Hyundai Santro (city car)
 Hyundai Shehzore (light truck)
 Hyundai Santa Fe (SUV)
 Hyundai Ioniq (hybrid car)

See also 
 Automotive industry in Pakistan

References

External links 
 Hyundai-Nishat

Hyundai Motor Company
Nishat Group
Car manufacturers of Pakistan
Pakistani companies established in 2017
Pakistani subsidiaries of foreign companies
Manufacturing companies based in Lahore
Vehicle manufacturing companies established in 2017